The 1987 Southwest Conference men's basketball tournament was held March 7–10, 1987, at Reunion Arena in Dallas, Texas. 

Number 8 seed Texas A&M defeated 2 seed  71-46 to win their 2nd championship and receive the conference's automatic bid to the 1987 NCAA tournament.

Format and seeding 
The tournament consisted of the top eight teams playing in a single-elimination tournament.

Bracket

References 

1986–87 Southwest Conference men's basketball season
Basketball in the Dallas–Fort Worth metroplex
Southwest Conference men's basketball tournament